Khor Deh Larim (also Romanized as Khor Deh Lārīm; also known as Khvor Deh Lārīm) is a village in Larim Rural District, Gil Khuran District, Juybar County, Mazandaran Province, Iran. At the 2006 census, its population was 130, in 35 families.

References 

Populated places in Juybar County